The 2019–20 Brighton & Hove Albion W.F.C. season was the club's 29th season in existence and their second in the FA Women's Super League, the highest level of the football pyramid. Along with competing in the WSL, the club also contested two domestic cup competitions: the FA Cup and the League Cup.

On 13 March 2020, in line with the FA's response to the coronavirus pandemic, it was announced the season was temporarily suspended until at least 3 April 2020. After further postponements, the season was ultimately ended prematurely on 25 May 2020 with immediate effect. Brighton sat in 9th at the time and retained their position on sporting merit after The FA Board's decision to award places on a points-per-game basis.

Squad

Management team

Pre-season

FA Women's Super League

Results summary

Results by matchday

Results

League table

Women's FA Cup 

As a member of the top two tiers, Brighton & Hove Albion entered the FA Cup in the fourth round, beating Championship teams Aston Villa and Crystal Palace in the fourth and fifth rounds respectively. A quarter-final against fellow WSL opposition Birmingham City was postponed due to the coronavirus pandemic before the season was ultimately curtailed. On 24 July 2020 it was announced the 2019–20 FA Cup would resume play during the 2020–21 season starting with the quarter-final ties rescheduled for the weekend of 26/27 September 2020.

FA Women's League Cup

Group stage

Knockout phase

Squad statistics

Appearances 

Starting appearances are listed first, followed by substitute appearances after the + symbol where applicable.

|-
|colspan="14"|Joined during 2020–21 season but competed in the postponed 2019–20 FA Cup:

|-
|colspan="14"|Players away from the club on loan:

|}

Goalscorers

Transfers

Transfers in

Loans in

Transfers out

Loans out

References 

Brighton & Hove Albion W.F.C. seasons
Brighton and Hove Albion